Burn Me Down may refer to:
 Burn Me Down (album), an album by Inez Jasper, or the title song
 "Burn Me Down" (Marty Stuart song)
 "Burn Me Down", a 2016 song by Nathan Sykes from Unfinished Business